Centrosomal protein of 70 kDa is a protein that in humans is encoded by the CEP70 gene.
The protein interacts with γ-tubulin through its coiled coil domains to localize at the centrosome. CEP70 is involved in organizing microtubules in interphase cells and is required for proper organization and orientation of the mitotic spindle.

References

External links

Further reading

Centrosome